Cyperus karthikeyanii is a species of sedge that is native to parts of India.

See also 
 List of Cyperus species

References 

karthikeyanii
Plants described in 2008
Flora of India